The Catholic District School Board of Eastern Ontario administers Catholic education for children up to grade 12, in the easternmost counties of Ontario, Canada (an amalgamation of Lanark, Leeds and Grenville, Prescott and Russell, Stormont, Dundas and Glengarry) including the cities of Brockville, Clarence-Rockland, Carleton Place and Cornwall. There are elections for Trustees held periodically. It has 28 elementary schools and the following ten high schools:

See also
Upper Canada District School Board
List of school districts in Ontario
List of high schools in Ontario

References

External links

Roman Catholic school districts in Ontario
Education in Lanark County
Education in Leeds and Grenville United Counties
Education in the United Counties of Prescott and Russell
Education in the United Counties of Stormont, Dundas and Glengarry